Malik Muhammad Javed Iqbal Awan is a Pakistani politician who was a Member of the Provincial Assembly of the Punjab, from 2002 to May 2018.

Early life and education
He was born on 7 November 1951 in Sargodha.

He has the degree of Bachelor of Arts and the degree of Bachelor of Laws where he received in 1976 from Punjab University Law College.

Political career

He was elected to the Provincial Assembly of the Punjab as a candidate of Pakistan Muslim League (Q) from Constituency PP-39 (Khushab-I) in 2002 Pakistani general election. He received 38,367 votes and defeated Malik Mukhtar Ahmed Awan, a candidate of National Alliance.

He was re-elected to the Provincial Assembly of the Punjab as an independent candidate from Constituency PP-39 (Khushab-I) in 2008 Pakistani general election. He received 24,235 votes and defeated Faisal Aziz, a candidate of PML-Q.

He was re-elected to the Provincial Assembly of the Punjab as a candidate of Pakistan Muslim League (N) (PML-N) from Constituency PP-39 (Khushab-I) in 2013 Pakistani general election. He received 42,635 votes and defeated Malik Ameer Mukhtar Sangha Awan, a candidate of Pakistan Tehreek-e-Insaf (PTI).

References

Living people
Punjab MPAs 2013–2018
1951 births
Pakistan Muslim League (N) politicians
Punjab MPAs 2008–2013
Punjab MPAs 2002–2007